Destroyer, in comics, may refer to:

DC Comics
 "Destroyer" (Justice League), the series finale episode of Justice League Unlimited

Marvel Comics
 Destroyer (Keen Marlow), a WW2 era superhero from Marvel Comics' predecessor, Timely Comics
 Destroyer (Roger Aubrey), Marvel Comics character who adopts Keen Marlow's identity
 Destroyer MAX, five-issue limited 2009 series from Marvel MAX, by Robert Kirkman, starring a modern day Keen Marlow
 The Destroyer (novel series), a paperback series of novels, which had a comics miniseries. It is unrelated to the above.
 Destroyer (Thor), the Asgardian weapon seen in Marvel Comics, usually opposed to Thor
 Drax the Destroyer, the Marvel Comics character
 Destroyer, a codename used by two members of the Marvel Comics sibling team, Power Pack

Boom! Studios 
 Victor LaValle's Destroyer, a limited series written by Victor Lavalle about Frankenstein's legacy.

See also
Destroyer (disambiguation)